Al-Sawalima was a Palestinian Arab village in the Jaffa Subdistrict. It was depopulated during the 1947–1948 Civil War in Mandatory Palestine on March 30, 1948. It was located 11 km northeast of Jaffa, situated 2 km north of the al-'Awja River.

History
In 1882  the PEF's Survey of Western Palestine noted at Khurbet es Sualimiyeh: “Traces of ruins only.“

British Mandate era
In the 1922 census of Palestine conducted by the British Mandate authorities, Sawalmeh had a population of 70 Muslims, increasing in the 1931 census when Es-Sawalmeh had 429 Muslim inhabitants.

In the 1945 statistics, the village had a population of 800 Muslims,  while the total land area was 5,942  dunams, according to an official land and population survey. Of the land area, a total of 894  were used for growing citrus and banana, 191 were for plantations and irrigable land, 4,566 for cereals, while 291  dunams were classified as non-cultivable areas.

Al-Sawalima had an elementary school for boys  founded in 1946, with 31 students.

1948 and aftermath
Benny Morris gives "Fear of being caught up in the fighting" and "Influence of nearby town's fall" as reasons for why the village became depopulated on March 30, 1948.

In 1992 the village site was described: "Cactuses grow on the village site. No identifiable traces of the former dwellings (tents or adobe houses) remain. Only the remnants of the one-room school are discernable. A highway runs past the north side of the site."

References

Bibliography

External links
Welcome To al-Sawalima
al-Sawalima, Zochrot
Survey of Western Palestine, Map 13: IAA,  Wikimedia commons

Arab villages depopulated during the 1948 Arab–Israeli War
District of Jaffa